Craig Tieszen (October 24, 1949 − November 23, 2017) was an American politician who was a Republican member of the South Dakota Senate, representing District 34 from January 2009 to January 2017, and represented District 34 in the South Dakota House of Representatives from January 2017 to his death 10 months later. Tieszen was a volunteer for the Peace Corps and served as the chief of police for the Rapid City Police Department.

Elections
2012 Tieszen was challenged in the June 5, 2012 Republican Primary but won with 2,115 votes (79.33%) and was unopposed for the November 6, 2012 General election, winning with 8,283 votes.
2008 When District 34 incumbent Republican Senator Royal McCracken was term limited and left the seat open, Tieszen won the June 3, 2008 Republican Primary with 1,640 votes (60.67%) and won the November 4, 2008 General election with 7,914 votes (70.29%) against Democratic nominee Gary Hargens.
2010 Tieszen was unopposed for both the June 8, 2010 Republican Primary and the November 2, 2010 General election, winning with 7,136 votes.

Death
On November 22, 2017, Tieszen and his brother-in-law, Brent Moline, were found dead in open water in the Cook Islands. It was concluded that Tieszen drowned while attempting to save his brother-in-law from drowning while kayaking.

References

External links
Official page at the South Dakota Legislature

Craig Tieszen at Ballotpedia
Craig Tieszen at the National Institute on Money in State Politics

1949 births
2017 deaths
Accidental deaths in the Cook Islands
American municipal police chiefs
Deaths by drowning
Republican Party members of the South Dakota House of Representatives
Peace Corps volunteers
Politicians from Rapid City, South Dakota
Republican Party South Dakota state senators
21st-century American politicians